Slesser is a surname. Notable people with the surname include:

 Henry Slesser (1883–1979), British barrister, politician, and judge
 Malcolm Slesser (1926–2007), Scottish energy analyst, scientist, and mountaineer
 Terry Slesser, English blues rock singer

See also
 Slessor (disambiguation)